The Financially Distressed Municipalities Act (Act of 1987, P.L. 246, No. 47), also known as Act 47, is a Pennsylvania statute outlining procedures to stabilize municipalities in Pennsylvania undergoing financial distress. The Act empowers the Pennsylvania Department of Community and Economic Development to declare certain municipalities as financially distressed. It provides for the restructuring of debt of financially distressed municipalities, limits the ability of financially distressed municipalities to obtain government funding; authorizes municipalities to participate in federal debt adjustment actions and bankruptcy actions under certain circumstances; and provides for consolidation or merger of contiguous municipalities to relieve financial distress.

History
Most provisions of Act 47 initially remained suspended until the termination of the Pennsylvania Intergovernmental Cooperation Act (Section 708 of Act 1991, June 5, P.L. 9, No 6).

The cities of Erie and Altoona, among others, have narrowly avoided Act 47 designation. Their mayors seek legislative changes to the binding arbitration rules of Act 111, as well as a reduction in the designation of tax-exempt properties, to improve their financial health.

Benefits of Act 47
Although some municipalities (listed in the chart below) have had the Financially Distressed designation removed, most cannot afford to lose the benefits Act 47 provides. The benefits include revenue from the nonresident wage tax available only to cities with Act 47 status.

Distressed municipalities
The following municipalities were designated as part of the Municipalities Financial Recovery Program as of the date indicated. Any dates of imposition and lifting of sanctions, and the rescinding of the initial designation are also noted.

 List of Act 47 Municipalities

References

External links
 Municipalities Financial Recovery Act, Third Edition, January 2001
 Pittsburgh Act 47 Plan

1987 in law
Pennsylvania statutes
1987 in Pennsylvania